You're Never Alone With a Cigarette (Sun City Girls Singles Volume 1) is a compilation album by American experimental rock band Sun City Girls, released on March 4, 2008 by Abduction Records. It comprises tracks previously released as singles and on various artists compilation albums.

Track listing

Personnel
Adapted from the You're Never Alone With a Cigarette (Sun City Girls Singles Volume 1) liner notes.

Sun City Girls
 Alan Bishop – bass guitar, acoustic guitar, reeds, vocals
 Richard Bishop – electric guitar
 Charles Gocher – drums, percussion

Production and additional personnel
 John Belluzzi – recording (9)
 Scott Colburn – mastering, mixing
 Eric Lanzillotta – design
 Sun City Girls – recording (1–8)

Release history

References 

2008 compilation albums
Sun City Girls albums